The Academia Dominicana de la Lengua (variously translated as the Dominican Academy of Language, the Dominican Academy of the Language, the Dominican Academy of Letters, or glossed as the Dominican Academy of the Spanish Language; acronym ADL)
is the Dominican Republic's correspondent academy of the Royal Spanish Academy. It was founded in Santo Domingo on 12 October 1927 and, like the other academies, has the principal function of working to regulate the Spanish language. 

It was created by the initiative of Archbishop Adolfo Alejandro Nouel. Currently, it has 29 members that are identified by the letters of the alphabet, from A to Z, and are considered members for life. It also counts with 30 correspondents.

Members

Academic members 
These are the members that belong to the academy for life. Their chairs are identified by the letters of the alphabet.

References

Languages of the Dominican Republic
Dominican Republic culture
Education in the Dominican Republic
Educational organizations based in the Dominican Republic
Spanish language academies
Organizations established in 1927
1927 establishments in North America